Jean Jullien (born 14 March 1983) is a French graphic designer and illustrator.

Biography

Early life 
Jullien was born in Cholet. He lived in Nantes and then moved to London in his twenties; he studied at the Central Saint Martins College of Art and Design and the Royal College of Art. His work has appeared in publications including Télérama, Le Nouvel Observateur, The New York Times and The Guardian, and his clients have included the Pompidou Centre, Yale University and Nike.

Peace for Paris 

In the wake of the November 2015 terrorist attacks in Paris, Jullien created a variation of a classic peace symbol invoking the Eiffel Tower. The image swiftly went viral through social media and news coverage of worldwide sympathies and affirmations of solidarity against terrorism. He also published a drawing in solidarity after the Charlie Hebdo shootings in January 2015.

The French embassy in Berlin used his symbol in an exterior lighting installation, accompanied by the slogan #NousSommesUnis (we are united).

International uses of Peace for Paris

Publications
 Des mots globe-trotters (2012, with Sylvain Alzial)
 
 Alceste-la-chouette, roi du camouflage (2015, with Sean Taylor)
 Jullien, Jean. "Before & After" Phaidon Press, 2017. .

References

External links

 

Living people
1983 births
French graphic designers
French illustrators
Alumni of Central Saint Martins
Alumni of the Royal College of Art
People from Cholet
Artists from Nantes